Abul Hasnat Muhammad Abdul Hai (died 12 October 2010) was a Bangladeshi politician. He was elected a member of the Jatiya Sangsad (National Parliament) from the seats of 227 Sunamganj-4 (Vishwambhar and Sunamganj sadar) and 228-Sunamganj-5 (Chhatak-Dowarabazar). He was elected a member of parliament for the first time as an independent candidate from Sylhet-4 in the 1973 first parliamentary elections. In the second parliamentary election an independent candidate in 1979, he was elected a member of the parliament in the Sylhet-5 constituency. He was a member of the Jatiya Party's elected a member of the parliament from Sunamganj-5 seat in the last 1986 in the third parliamentary election.

Birth and early life 
Abdul Hai was born into a Bengali Muslim family in the village of Bhatgaon in Chhatak (then under Sylhet district). He was the second of the three sons of Moulvi Abdul Wahid and Mahebun Nesa. His elder brother, Abdul Hoque, was also a politician and participated in the Bangladesh Liberation War.

Political life 
Abdul Hai, a senior politician in Sunamganj District of Sylhet Division of Bangladesh. He was elected a member of parliament for the first time as an independent candidate from Sylhet-4 in the 1973 first parliamentary elections. In the second parliamentary election an independent candidate in 1979, he was elected a member of the parliament in the Sylhet-5 constituency. He was a member of the Jatiya Party's elected a member of the parliament from Sunamganj-5 seat in the last 1986 in the third parliamentary election.

Death 
Abdul Hai died on 12 October 2010 at his home in Sunamganj.

References 

1st Jatiya Sangsad members
2nd Jatiya Sangsad members
3rd Jatiya Sangsad members
2010 deaths
People from Chhatak Upazila
Jatiya Party (Ershad) politicians